John Pearce (November 27, 1927 - April 29, 2000) was an American theater, television and film actor, as well as occasional stuntman.

Partial filmography
A Covenant with Death (1967) as Minister (uncredited)
Cool Hand Luke (1967) as John (uncredited)
The Student Nurses (1970) as Patient
THX 1138 (1970) as DWY
Sweet Kill (1972) as Mr. Howard
The Culpepper Cattle Co. (1972) as Spectator Merlotte
The Great Northfield Minnesota Raid (1972) as Frank James
Ulzana's Raid (1972) as Corporal Pinot
Billy Two Hats (1974) as Spencer
The Klansman (1974) as Taggart
The Call of the Wild (1976, TV Movie) as 2nd Man
September 30, 1955 (1977) as Randy / T.V. Man
The Stunt Man (1980) as Garage Guard 
Little Treasure (1985) as Joseph

References

External links

1927 births
2000 deaths
American male film actors
American male stage actors
American male television actors
Deaths from oral cancer
Male actors from Georgia (U.S. state)
People from Gainesville, Georgia
20th-century American male actors